= The Beat Cop's Guide to Chicago Eats =

2010 food guide

- Author: David Joseph Haynes and Christopher "Bull" Garlington
- Genre: Food guide
- Publisher: Lake Claremont Press
- Publication date: 2010
- Media type: Paperback

The Beat Cop's Guide to Chicago Eats! is a 2010 paperback food guide by Sgt. David Joseph Haynes and Christopher "Bull" Garlington, published by Lake Claremont Press. The book examines popular Chicago cafes and restaurants frequented by Chicago Police officers.
